Richer was bishop of Verdun from 1089 to 1107. Godfrey of Bouillon, Duke of Lower Lorraine, who decided to join the First Crusade ceded the County of Verdun to Richer in 1095. Richer soon granted the county to Godfrey's brother, Baldwin, but Baldwin also joined the crusade.

References

Sources

11th-century French Roman Catholic bishops
12th-century French Roman Catholic bishops
Bishops of Verdun